Raphia vinifera, the West African piassava palm, bamboo palm or West African bass fibre is a palm tree species in the genus Raphia. It is native to Benin, Gambia, Ghana, Nigeria, Togo, Central African Republic, Cameroon, Ghana, and Democratic Republic of the Congo ( = Zaire = Congo-Kinshasa). It is particularly abundant along the creeks of Niger Delta, Cross River, Lagos and Ikorodu in Nigeria.

The nut contains bitter oil, which has the property of stupefying fish.

References

External links

vinifera
Flora of Benin
Flora of the Democratic Republic of the Congo
Flora of the Gambia
Flora of Ghana
Flora of Nigeria
Flora of Togo
Flora of the Central African Republic
Flora of Cameroon
Taxa named by Palisot de Beauvois